The Centre for Studies on Federalism (CSF) was established in November 2000 with the primary purpose of studying and researching the theory and practice of Federalism both as a  political doctrine and in its implementation in the institutional systems of the Modern state. CSF's main focus is on the infra-national, macro-regional and global scale of federalism: it specifically considers regional integration at a time of globalisation, with special reference to Europe, its history and civilization, its progress towards unification and its future.

Structure and mission 

CSF is housed at the Collegio Carlo Alberto in Turin. It was established as a research centre jointly with the University of Pavia and University of Turin, with the Foundation Compagnia di San Paolo, and was subsequently joined by the University of Milan.  
The purpose of CSF – as stated in its Statute of Association is to promote and coordinate scientific research on studies on federalism, as well promoting and coordinating activities with member universities and other Italian and foreign international universities and research centres. Furthermore, CSF also cooperates with private and public agencies and bodies interested in promoting fostering the development of knowledge and implementation of federalist principles.  
The CSF is governed by a Board which sets the guidelines for the scientific projects and fund allocation, the Steering Committee, the Board of Auditors and by a Scientific Committee whose members are renowned international scholars and experts of federalism. The administrative and scientific staff also include researchers from several universities and fields of research, including Law, Economics, Social, Political Science and History. Lastly, CSF's Library contains some 12,000 books volumes, subscribes to 70 newspapers, journals and magazines. It also houses 500 ones titles that are no longer in print as well as a number of special collections bequeathed to the centre, such as the CIME Archive of  the Italian Council of the European Movement and the online document summary of the Altiero Spinelli Collection, of which the  hard copies are at Historical Archives of the European Union administered by the European University Institute in Florence.

Research 

Research at the  CSF is aimed at furthering the development of knowledge on the various aspects of Federalism, promoting debate in the public arena by studying and researching the public arena through studies and research on the above and to encourage researchers and experts to contribute to the discussion on European and international issues. 
Our Research Papers are addressed to Academia but also cover the facets and issues of interest for diplomats, politicians and several other professional arenas. 
Furthermore, CSF activity includes a number of editorial projects, in-depth studies, monitoring and surveying of global trends related to processes of federation, regional integration and international democracy. These include:

	Perspectives on Federalism: an online journal with a forum on federalism in all tiers of government – regional and global sub-national authorities.
	Bibliographical Bulletin on Federalism: an online quarterly offering providing an overview of articles on  Federalism from 700 Italian, English, French, German and Spanish journals and papers.
	International Democracy Watch: a portal whose purpose is to collect, compare and analyse a set of data to monitor  progress and developments of democracy, international institutions and agencies, assessing such changes through regular  monitoring;
	Operations within the framework of the Common Security and Defence Policy (EU CSDP Operations): these projects are aimed at gathering information for a comparative analysis of military, policing and state operations within the EU Common Foreign and Security Policy (CFSP) since 2003.
	The Fiscal Federalism Watch to gain a better understanding of the reorganization of the Italian public finance system in Italy and what the consequences of a constitutional reform needed for fiscal federalism would be

Events and activities 

CSF organises meetings and seminars jointly with other institutions and research bodies  devoted to a more comprehensive understanding of certain topics or to the presentation of books some of which published by CSF. The Altiero Spinelli Lecture is the CSF's most important academic event: a yearly conference with a keynote lecture (lectio magistralis) held by an internationally renowned expert or academic on a European or Federalist topic. The idea of naming the lecture after Altiero Spinelli, one of the founding fathers of European Federalism, came from the need for an ad hoc conference to study European integration more in depth. CSF also offers and Education programme, with post graduate courses in Law and Business, organised with the Turin University Institute of European Studies, aimed at offering advanced studies on law and economics with a special focus on to the internal EU market.

See also 

Alexander Hamilton
Altiero Spinelli
Carl Joachim Friedrich
Carlo Cattaneo
Daniel J. Elazar
Ernesto Rossi
European Federalist Movement
European Integration
European Union
Federalism
Federalist Papers
Federation
Fiscal federalism
History of European Union
John Robert Seeley
Kenneth Wheare
International organization
Lionel Robbins
Luigi Einaudi
Philip Henry Kerr
Pierre-Joseph Proudhon
Regional integration
Regionalism (politics)
Young European Federalists
Ventotene Manifesto

Notes

External links 
 
Compagnia di San Paolo
Collegio Carlo Alberto
University of Turin
University of Pavia
University of Milan
European Federalist Movement
Union of European Federalists
Altiero Spinelli Institute
Mario and Valeria Albertini Foundation

Centro Studi sul Federalismo
Political research institutes